Atchin is an islet off the north-eastern coast of Malakula in Vanuatu. The 1999 census showed a population of 761, which had decreased to 738 by 2009.

The Atchin language is spoken on the island.

References

Islands of Vanuatu
Malampa Province